Gourmya is a genus of sea snails, marine gastropod mollusks in the family Cerithiidae.

Species
Species within the genus Gourmya include:
 Gourmya gourmyi (Crosse, 1861)
 Gourmya (Gladiocerithium) argutum (Monterosato, 1911)<ref>{{WRMS species|473599|'Gourmya (Gladiocerithium) argutum (Monterosato, 1911)||17 May 2010}}</ref>
 Species brought into synonymy 
 Gourmya echinata (Lamarck, 1822) accepted as Cerithium echinatum'' Lamarck, 1822

References

Cerithiidae